Nuno Filipe Oliveira Santos (born 9 July 1978) is a Portuguese former professional footballer who played as a goalkeeper.

Playing career
Born in Coimbra, Baixo Mondego, Santos started his professional career with Sporting CP. Barred by the likes of Peter Schmeichel and Ricardo during his spell he only appeared once for the first team in the Primeira Liga, and was loaned to several clubs during his contract, including F.C. Penafiel in the second division in the 2003–04 season.

After helping the northern side return to the top flight, Santos had his loan extended until 30 June 2005. At the end of the campaign, which ended with an 11th position and the subsequent league status preservation, he agreed to a permanent deal.

Subsequently, Santos joined Vitória de Guimarães, battling for second-choice duties with Serginho as Brazilian Nilson was the undisputed starter. In 2009–10 he left for Vitória de Setúbal on a free transfer, and featured in 15 matches during the season – the other goalkeeper, Mário Felgueiras, played 14 – as the Sadinos barely avoided top-tier relegation.

In the summer of 2010, Santos initially signed with Portimonense S.C. for one year. However, shortly after, the deal fell through and the player joined Gil Vicente F.C. of division two, also in a one-year contract. He played the first game of the campaign, a 2–1 home win against C.D. Trofense, but was replaced by Vítor Murta in the 10th minute after suffering an injury.

Coaching career
After retiring in early 2015 at the age of 36, Santos joined his last club G.D. Ribeirão's staff as a goalkeeper coach. In the same capacity, he later worked with Gil Vicente's youths and Leixões SC.

Santos returned to Gil Vicente and their under-19 side ahead of 2017–18, but now as manager.

Honours
Individual
Toulon Tournament Best Goalkeeper (2): 1997, 1998

References

External links

1978 births
Living people
Sportspeople from Coimbra
Portuguese footballers
Association football goalkeepers
Primeira Liga players
Liga Portugal 2 players
Segunda Divisão players
Sporting CP footballers
Sporting CP B players
C.F. Estrela da Amadora players
F.C. Penafiel players
Vitória S.C. players
Vitória F.C. players
Portimonense S.C. players
Gil Vicente F.C. players
S.C. Covilhã players
G.D. Ribeirão players
Portugal youth international footballers
Portugal under-21 international footballers